François-Joseph is a given name, and may refer to:

 François-Joseph Amon d'Aby (1913–2007), Ivoirian playwright and essayist
 François-Joseph de Beaupoil de Sainte-Aulaire (1643-1742), French poet and army officer
 François-Joseph Bélanger (1744-1818), French architect and decorator
 François-Joseph Bérardier de Bataut (1720-1794), French teacher, writer and translator
 François-Joseph Bissot (1673–1737), Canadian merchant, navigator and a co-seigneur of Mingan; son of François Byssot de la Rivière
 François-Joseph Bressani (1612-1672), Jesuit priest
 Général François-Joseph Chaussegros de Léry (1754-1824), Canadian Engineer-in-Chief and Commander-in-Chief of Napoleon's Armies Armies in Holland
 François-Joseph d'Offenstein (1760-1837), French general and military commander
 François-Joseph de Champagny (1804–1882), French author and historian
 François-Joseph Duret (1732-1816), French sculptor
 François-Joseph Fétis (1784-1871), Belgian musicologist, composer, critic and teacher
 François-Joseph Hunauld (1701–1742), French anatomist 
 François-Joseph Laflèche (1879–1945), Canadian politician
 François-Joseph Navez (1787-1869), Belgian neo-classical painter
 François-Joseph Talma (1763-1826), French actor
 Nzanga Mobutu (François-Joseph Mobutu Nzanga Ngbangawe) (born 1970), politician in the Democratic Republic of the Congo

See also
 François-Joseph-Philippe
 François-Joseph-Victor
 François-Xavier-Joseph
 Joseph François
 Joseph-François